Ferencvárosi Torna Club is a Hungarian professional association football club, based in Budapest, Hungary.

Honours
Hungarian League
 Winners (31) 12: 1903, 1905, 1906–07, 1908–09, 1909–10, 1910–11, 1911–12, 1912–13, 1925–26, 1926–27, 1927–28, 1931–32, 1933–34, 1937–38, 1939–40, 1940–41, 1948–49, 1962–63, 1964, 1967, 1968, 1975–76, 1980–81, 1991–92, 1994–95, 1995–96, 2000–01, 2003–04, 2015–16, 2018–19, 2019–20
Hungarian Cup
 Winners (23) 13: 1912–13, 1921–22, 1926–27, 1927–28, 1932–33, 1934–35, 1941–42, 1942–43, 1943–44, 1955–58, 1971–72, 1973–74, 1975–76, 1977–78, 1990–91, 1992–93, 1993–94, 1994–95, 2002–03, 2003–04, 2014–15, 2015–16, 2016–17
Hungarian Super Cup
 Winners (6): 1993, 1994, 1995, 2004, 2015, 2016
Hungarian League Cup
 Winners (2): 2012–13, 2014–15
Inter-Cities Fairs Cup
 Winners (1): 1964–65
Runners-up (1): 1967–68
UEFA Cup Winners' Cup
Runners-up (1): 1974–75
Mitropa Cup
 Winners (2): 1928, 1937
Runners-up (4): 1935, 1938, 1939, 1940
Challenge Cup
Winner (1): 1909
Runners-up (1): 1911

Notes
Note 12: more than any other Hungarian football club.
Note 13: more than any other Hungarian football club.

Players

Most appearances

Top scorers

Notes
Note 22: co-top scorer of the Hungarian League.
Note 23: also played for Stadler FC.
Note 24: in the Hungarian League 2.

Award winners
Ballon d'Or
The following players have won the Ballon d'Or while playing for Ferencvárosi TC:
 Flórián Albert – 1967

Transfer records

Record departures

Record arrivals

Managerial records
Longest-serving manager: Tibor Nyilasi 4 years

Team records

First Matches
First Nemzeti Bajnokság I match: Ferencvárosi TC 3-5 Műegyetemi AFC, 1901 Nemzeti Bajnokság I, 21 April 1901

Biggest wins

Magyar Kupa
Biggest win: Szekszárdi UFC 0-10 Ferencváros (29 October 2013) (2013–14 Magyar Kupa)
Biggest win: Nagyecsed 0–10 Ferencváros (14 October 2014) (2015–16 Magyar Kupa)

European Cup
Biggest win: Ferencváros 9–0 Keflavík ÍF  (8 September 1965) (1965–66 European Cup)

Cup Winners' Cup
Biggest win: Ferencváros 6–0 Floriana F.C.  (27 September 1972) (1972–73 UEFA Cup Winners' Cup)

UEFA Cup
Biggest win: Ferencváros 6–0 Panionios F.C.  (20 October 1971) (1971–72 UEFA Cup)

Goals
Most league goals scored in a season: 140 – 1940–41 Nemzeti Bajnokság I

Points

Attendances
 highest league average attendance - 48 846 in 1959/60 season
 highest league home game attendance - 85 000 20 July 1958 against MTK on Népstadion.

References

Ferencvárosi TC
Hungarian football club statistics